Charles Edward Livesey (6 February 1938 – 26 February 2005) was a footballer who played for Chelsea in Football League Division 1 between 1959 and 1961, as well as appearing for various clubs in all four divisions of the Football League.

References

External links
Obituary from Brighton & Hove Albion

1938 births
2005 deaths
Footballers from West Ham
English footballers
Chelsea F.C. players
Southampton F.C. players
Gillingham F.C. players
Watford F.C. players
Northampton Town F.C. players
Brighton & Hove Albion F.C. players
Crawley Town F.C. players
Association football forwards